Matthijs Balen (1684 in Dordrecht – 1766 in Dordrecht) was an 18th-century painter from the Northern Netherlands.

According to the RKD he was a registered pupil of Arnold Houbraken, and like him, became a printmaker as well as a painter. He lived in The Hague from 1705–1715 and is known for Italianate landscapes, portraits, and historical allegories.

He was probably the son or grandson of the Dordrecht writer Mathias Balen, who wrote Beschryvinge der stad Dordrecht in 1677. Houbraken himself had been a pupil of Samuel van Hoogstraten and was friends with Romeyn de Hooghe, both of whom assisted the elder Balen with some poems and etchings for his book.

References

Matthijs Balen on Artnet

1684 births
1766 deaths
18th-century Dutch painters
18th-century Dutch male artists
Dutch male painters
Artists from Dordrecht